Faissal Boulakjar (born 28 April 1979) is a Moroccan-born Dutch politician, who has been serving as a member of the House of Representatives since the 2021 Dutch general election. He is a member of the social liberal party Democrats 66 (D66) and previously held a seat in the Breda municipal council (2014–21).

Early life, education, and career 
Boualkjar was born in 1979 in the Moroccan village Tifarouine and has three brothers and three sisters. His family emigrated to the Netherlands in 1983 after his father had moved there in 1966 to work in a factory of the snack brand Nibb-it. He grew up in the Breda neighborhood Heusdenhout. Between 1993 and 1998, Boulakjar attended the secondary school Olof/Florijn College at  level before studying facility management at Spectrum College until 2004. He would later also earn an  degree.

He was a security guard at the Breda retirement home Raffy in the years 2004–06 and subsequently worked as a youth worker for Surplus Welzijn. He also helped organize free futsal training for disadvantaged children next to his job. Boulakjar became a reintegration adviser in 2011 but left that position the following year to work as a personal injury adviser until 2018. Thereafter, he served as an independent trainer and adviser and as an adviser of the program Samen Ouder Worden (Getting older together), which promotes volunteering for elderly people.

Politics 
Boulakjar joined Democrats 66 in 2009 because of the rise of populism and was elected to the Breda municipal council in the 2014 municipal election. His specializations were youth, education, sports, and sustainability, and he became his party's vice caucus leader one year later. He was re-elected in the 2018 municipal election as D66's third candidate, remained vice caucus leader, and served as the party's spokesperson for construction, housing, climate, security, and the region. In 2019, Boulakjar and councilors from the Labour Party wrote a policy paper, in which they called for solving problems in the vulnerable district Hoge Vucht. He also served as manager of D66's campaign in the Breda region for three elections in 2018 and 2019.

He ran for member of parliament in the 2021 general election, being placed sixteenth on D66's party list. Boulakjar was installed as House member on 31 March after he had been elected with 2,875 preference votes. He vacated his seat in the Breda municipal council the following day. Within his caucus, his specializations are housing, spatial planning, railways, and public transport. The latter two were later in his term replaced by mining and the reinforcement of houses in Groningen to survive earthquakes caused by gas extraction. Boulakjar is a member of the parliamentary Committees for Agriculture, Nature and Food Quality; for Economic Affairs and Climate Policy; for Infrastructure and Water Management; and for the Interior; and he is on the Benelux Interparliamentary Consultative Council.

He was one of D66's  in Breda in the 2022 municipal elections.

Personal life 
Boulakjar is a resident of the North Brabant village Teteringen, which is located close to Breda. He has a wife called Bouchra, and he has two sons and a daughter.

References 

1979 births
21st-century Dutch politicians
Democrats 66 politicians
Living people
Members of the House of Representatives (Netherlands)
Moroccan emigrants to the Netherlands
Municipal councillors of Breda